The inauguration of the president of Ireland is a ceremony to mark the commencement of a new seven-year term of the president of Ireland. The inauguration takes place on the day following the expiry of the term of office of the preceding president. No location is specified in the constitution, but all inaugurations have taken place in Saint Patrick's Hall in the State Apartments in Dublin Castle. The ceremony is transmitted live by national broadcaster RTÉ on its principal television and radio channels, typically from around 11 am. To highlight the significance of the event, all key figures in the executive (the government of Ireland), the legislature (Oireachtas) and the judiciary attend, as do members of the diplomatic corps and other invited guests.

During the period of the Irish Free State (1922 to 1937), the governor-general had been installed into office as the representative of the Crown in a low-key ceremony, twice in Leinster House (the seat of the Oireachtas), but in the case of the last governor-general, Domhnall Ua Buachalla, in his brother's drawing room. By contrast, the Constitution of Ireland adopted in 1937 requires the president's oath of office be taken in public.

Oath of Office
Under the Constitution, in assuming office the president must subscribe to a formal declaration, made publicly and in the presence of members of both Houses of the Oireachtas, judges of the Supreme Court and the High Court, and other "public personages". The inauguration of the president takes place in St Patrick's Hall in Dublin Castle. The declaration is specified in Article 12.8:

In the presence of Almighty God, I, [name], do solemnly and sincerely promise and declare that I will maintain the Constitution of Ireland and uphold its laws, that I will fulfil my duties faithfully and conscientiously in accordance with the Constitution and the law, and that I will dedicate my abilities to the service and the welfare of the people of Ireland. May God direct and sustain me.

To date every president has subscribed to the declaration in Irish. Erskine H. Childers, who never learnt Irish and spoke with a distinctive Oxbridge accent that made pronouncing Irish quite difficult, opted with some reluctance for the Irish version in 1973. Pictures of the event show Childers reading from an exceptionally large board where it had been written down phonetically for him. At his second inauguration in 2018, Michael D. Higgins first made the declaration in Irish, then repeated it in English.

Presidential address
Having taken the Declaration of Office, the new president traditionally delivers an address to the guests. Constitutionally all addresses or messages to 'the Nation' or to 'the Oireachtas' are supposed to have prior government approval. Some lawyers have questioned whether the speech at the inauguration should fall into the category requiring government approval. However, as it is impractical to get approval given that the new president is only president for a matter of moments before delivering the speech and so has not had a time to submit it, any constitutional questions as to its status are ignored.

Religious and humanist involvement
Inauguration Day involves a lot of ritual and ceremonial. Until 1983 the morning saw the president-elect, accompanied by their spouse, escorted by the Presidential Motorcycle Escort to one of Dublin's cathedrals. If they were Catholic they were brought to St Mary's Pro-Cathedral for a Pontifical High Mass. If they were Church of Ireland, they were brought to St Patrick's Cathedral for a Divine Service. In the 1970s instead of separate denominational ceremonies a single ecumenical multi-faith service was held in the cathedral of the faith of the president-elect. Some additional religious ceremonies also featured: President-elect Cearbhall Ó Dálaigh attended a prayer ceremony in a synagogue in Dublin to reflect his longstanding relationship with the Jewish Community in Ireland.

In 1983, to reduce the costs of the day in a period of economic retrenchment, the separate religious blessing ceremony was incorporated into the inauguration ceremony itself, with the president-elect blessed by representatives of the Roman Catholic Church, the Church of Ireland, the Presbyterian Church, Methodism, the Society of Friends, and the Jewish and Islamic faiths. This inter-faith service has featured in the inaugurations since 1983. Since 2011, a representative from the Humanist Association of Ireland, representing humanism and the non-religious population of Ireland, has appeared alongside ministers of a religion.

Dress codes
For the first inauguration in 1938 President-elect Douglas Hyde wore a morning suit, with black silk top hat. Morning suits continued to be a standard feature of Irish presidential inaugurations until 1997 when Mary McAleese, whose husband disliked wearing formal suits, abolished their use for inaugurations (and for all other presidential ceremonial). From then, guests were required to wear plain business suits, and judges were prohibited from wearing their distinctive wigs and gowns. Ambassadors were also discouraged from wearing national dress.

End of the day
The president-elect (unless they are already a serving president, in which case they will already be living in the presidential residence) are usually driven to the inauguration from their private home. After the ceremony they are driven through the streets of Dublin to Áras an Uachtaráin, the official presidential residence, where they are welcomed by the secretary-general to the president, the head of the presidential secretariat.

That evening, the Irish government hosts a reception in their honour in the State Apartments (the former Royal Apartments) in Dublin Castle. Whereas the dress code was formerly white tie affair, it is now more usually black tie.

References

Ceremonies in the Republic of Ireland
Office of the President of Ireland